The Two Rivals (Spanish: Los dos rivales, Italian: Meravigliosa) is a 1960 Italian-Spanish film directed by Carlos Arévalo and Siro Marcellini and starring Luciano Tajoli, Rita Giannuzzi and Nunzio Gallo.

Cast

References

Bibliography 
 Pascual Cebollada & Luis Rubio Gil. Enciclopedia del cine español: cronología''. Ediciones del Serbal, 1996.

External links 
 

1960 films
Spanish comedy films
Italian comedy films
1960s Spanish-language films
Films directed by Siro Marcellini
Films directed by Carlos Arévalo
1960s Spanish films
1960s Italian films